Griffith 'Giotto' Griffiths (15 September 1864 – 22 July 1938) was a Welsh international rugby union half-back who played club rugby for Llanelli and international rugby for Wales.

Rugby career
Griffiths came to note as a rugby player when playing for club team Llanelli. In 1888 Griffiths was part of the Llanelli squad who faced the first touring Southern Hemisphere rugby team, the New Zealand Natives. Griffiths was constant in rushes against the Maoris, and the game was decided by a single long range dropped goal from Llanelli's Harry Bowen. Griffiths was later selected for the Welsh national team, partnered with Newport's Charlie Thomas, in a match against Ireland as part of the 1889 Home Nations Championship. The Welsh team on that day included four Llanelli players, Griffith's team-mates being Tom Morgan, Dan Griffiths and Ned Roberts, all four playing their final international match. The game was played at St. Helen's and the Wales team was captained for the first time by rugby superstar Arthur 'Monkey' Gould. Wales lost the game by two tries to nil and in the next game Griffiths was replaced by William Stadden, and never represented his country again.

International matches played
Wales (rugby union)
 Ireland 1889

Bibliography

References 

Welsh rugby union players
Wales international rugby union players
Rugby union halfbacks
Llanelli RFC players
1864 births
1938 deaths
Rugby union players from Llanelli